Landry Macrez (born 30 April 1982) is a French professional ice hockey goaltender  currently playing for the Scorpions de Mulhouse in the Ligue Magnus.

Career 
Macrez made his senior professional debut for Dragons de Rouen in France's Ligue Magnus in 2002 and, in his first season, Macrez and the Dragon's were crowned Ligue Magnus champions. After two seasons in Rouen he moved to another Ligue Magnus team, Corsaires de Dunkerque, where he spent 2004 and 2005. The 2005 season, however, saw them relegated to FFHG Division 1 and Macrez, looking to return to competition at the highest level, returned to Rouen and the Ligue Magnus for season 2006. Another shift in 2007 saw Macrez tend goal for Gothiques d'Amiens before arriving at the Lyon Hockey Club for season 2008.  In 2009 he moved to Amnéville Galaxians and in 2010 he moved to Albatros de Brest.

Macrez has represented France at the 1999 Under-18 World Championships, the 2001 Under-20 World Championships and the 2006 Senior B World Championships where he was part of France's world champion team.

Playing style 

Macrez is a left-handed goalkeeper.

External links

French ice hockey goaltenders
1982 births
Living people
Brest Albatros Hockey players
Rouen HE 76 players
Gothiques d'Amiens players
HC Morzine-Avoriaz players
Scorpions de Mulhouse players
Sportspeople from Amiens